Alteraurantiacibacter buctensis is a bacterium from the genus Alteraurantiacibacter which has been isolated from the core of a mudstone from the Mohe Basin in China.

References 

Sphingomonadales
Bacteria described in 2016